Tunstall is a hamlet near Eccleshall in the borough of Stafford in Staffordshire, England. In 1870–72 it had a population of 72. Tunstall was recorded in the Domesday Book as Tunestal.

See also
Listed buildings in Adbaston

References 

Hamlets in Staffordshire
Borough of Stafford